Burkholder is a surname. Notable people with the surname include:

Dave Burkholder (contemporary), Canadian college ice hockey coach
Donald Burkholder (1927–2013), American mathematician
J. Peter Burkholder (born 1954), American musicologist
James B. Burkholder (1918–2006), American army officer, activist for peace and social justice issues
JoAnn Marie Burkholder (born 1953), American ecologist
Mabel Burkholder (1881–1973), Canadian historian and author
Max Burkholder (born 1997), American child voice actor
Seth Burkholder (born 1982), American football player
Steve Burkholder (contemporary), Republican politician from Colorado, mayor of Lakewood 1999–2007
Walter H. Burkholder (1898–1977), American plant pathologist